= Jürgen Friedl =

Austrian footballer

Personal information
- Date of birth: 21 January 1981 (age 45)
- Place of birth: Linz, Austria

Jürgen Friedl is an Austrian professional footballer who plays as a midfielder for Union Weißkirchen. He has played for several clubs since 2001, including Red Bull Salzburg in the Bundesliga.
